Las Uvas is a corregimiento in San Carlos District, Panamá Oeste Province, Panama with a population of 1,587 as of 2010. Its population as of 1990 was 1,170; its population as of 2000 was 1,424.

References

Corregimientos of Panamá Oeste Province